Bilaspur is a town and a nagar panchayat in Gautam Buddha Nagar district  in the state of Uttar Pradesh, India.This town is 400 years old and was once a collection center of revenue. Monuments continue to be constructed in the town by Mughal & British citizens.

Demographics
 India census, Bilaspur had a population of 15,500. Males constitute 53% of the population and females 47%. Bilaspur has an average literacy rate of 67%, lower than the national average of 70.5%; with male literacy of 58% and female literacy of 38%. 18% of the population is under 6 years of age.

References

Cities and towns in Gautam Buddh Nagar district